Mannosidase is an enzyme which hydrolyses mannose.

There are two types:
 alpha-Mannosidase
 beta-Mannosidase

A deficiency is associated with mannosidosis.

A family of mannosidases are also responsible for processing newly formed glycoproteins in the endoplasmic reticulum into mature glycoproteins containing highly heterogeneous complex-type glycans.

References

EC 3.2.1